The Basílica de Santa María de la Asunción  is a church in Arcos de la Frontera, Andalusia, in southern Spain. It was built in the 15th-16th century. It was declared Bien de Interés Cultural in 1931.

History of this church site dates back to the 8th and 9th centuries. It was built on the remains of a former Moorish mosque. The main facade is in Gothic-Plateresque architectural style with the neoclassical tower being the newest addition.

See also 
 List of Bien de Interés Cultural in the Province of Cádiz
 List of former mosques in Spain

References

External links

Bien de Interés Cultural landmarks in the Province of Cádiz
Churches in the Province of Cádiz
Buildings and structures in Cádiz
Churches in Andalusia
Former mosques in Spain
16th-century Roman Catholic church buildings in Spain
Minor basilicas in Spain